The 8th Grand National Assembly of Turkey existed from 21 July 1946 to 22 May 1950. 
There were 499 MPs in the parliament. 66 of them were the members of newly founded Democrat Party (DP) and 8 of them were independents. The rest were the members of the Republican People's Party (CHP).

Main parliamentary milestones 
Some of the important events in the history of the parliament are the following:
5 August 1946 - İsmet İnönü was reelected as the President of Turkey for the fourth time 
5 August 1946 – Kazım Karabekir was elected as the speaker of the parliament
5 August 1946– Recep Peker of CHP formed the 15th government of Turkey
26 December 1946– İsmet İnönü acted as a mediator between the two parties and DP which was boycotting the parliament agreed to participate in the parliament
9 September 1947 – Hasan Saka of CHP formed the 16th government of Turkey
18 June 1948 – Hasan Saka formed the 17th government of Turkey
19 July 1948 - Nation Party was founded
14 January- Şemsettin Günaltay of CHP formed the 18th government of Turkey
3 June 1949- Law 5421 New Income tax law
16 February 1950 - Law 5545 New election Law
14 May 1950 - General elections

References

1946 establishments in Turkey
1950 disestablishments in Turkey
08
8th parliament of Turkey
Republican People's Party (Turkey)
Democrat Party (Turkey, 1946–1961)
Nation Party (Turkey, 1948)
Political history of Turkey